Yum cha is the Cantonese tradition of brunch involving Chinese tea and dim sum. The practice is popular in cantonese-speaking regions, including Guangdong province, Guangxi province, Hong Kong, and Macau. It is also carried out in other regions worldwide where there are overseas Cantonese communities. Yum cha generally involves small portions of steamed, pan-fried, or deep-fried dim sum dishes served in bamboo steamers, which are designed to be eaten communally and washed down with hot tea. People often go to yum cha in large groups for family gatherings and celebrations.

Description 

Yum cha (lit. "drink tea"), also known as going for dim sum (Cantonese: 食點心), is the Cantonese tradition of brunch involving Chinese tea and dim sum. The practice is popular in Cantonese-speaking regions such as Guangdong, Guangxi, Hong Kong, and Macau. It is also carried out in other regions worldwide where there are overseas Chinese communities, like Vietnam, Australia and the United States.

Yum cha generally involves small portions of steamed, pan-fried, or deep-fried dim sum dishes served in bamboo steamers, which are designed to be eaten communally and washed down with hot tea.   Traditionally, the elderly gather to eat dim sum after morning exercises.  Many have yum cha with family during weekends and holiday gatherings.

Etymology 
Yum cha in the Cantonese language, both literary and vernacular, literally means "drink tea". "飲" means "to drink", and "茶" means "tea". The term is also used interchangeably with tan cha (嘆茶) in the Cantonese language, which colloquially translates to "enjoy tea".

In Cantonese, yum cha refers to having a meal with dim sum dishes. Dim sum is the English word based on the Cantonese pronunciation of 點心. 

In colloquial Mandarin dialects and Standard Vernacular Chinese based on one form of colloquial Mandarin, this character is often used to mean 飲 for the verb "drink". In the Chinese language, 點心 refers to a variety of foods, including European-style cakes and pastries, and has no equivalent in English. 

In the English language, dim sum refers to small-dish appetizers and desserts.

Service

Traditionally, yum cha is practiced in the morning or early afternoon, hence the terms zou cha ("morning tea") or ha ng cha ("afternoon tea") when appropriate. The former is also known as yum zou cha ("drinking morning tea").  In some parts of Guangdong province, restaurants offer dim sum during dinner hours and even late at night. This is known as yum je cha ("drinking night tea"), though most venues still generally reserve the serving of dim sum for breakfast and lunch periods. The combination of morning tea, afternoon tea, evening tea, lunch and dinner is known as sam cha leung fan ("three tea, two meal").

The history of the tradition can be traced back to the period of Xianfeng Emperor, who first referred to establishments serving tea as yi li guan ("1 cent house"). These offered a place for people to gossip, which became known as cha waa ("tea talk"). These tea houses grew to become their own type of restaurant and the visits became known as yum cha.

The traditional methods of serving dim sum include using trays strung around servers' necks or using push carts.  The teoi ce ("push-cart") method of serving dim sum, dates back to the early 1960s and includes dim sum items cooked in advance, placed into steamer baskets, and brought out on push carts into the dining area.  Employees call out the items they are serving, customers notify the server about the items they would like to order, and the server places the desired items on the table.  The general yum cha atmosphere is a loud, festive one due to the servers calling out the dishes and the groups of diners having conversations.

Many dim sum restaurants now use a paper-based à la carte ordering system. This method provides fresh, cooked-to-order dim sum while managing the real estate and resource constraints involved with push cart service.

The cost of a meal was traditionally calculated by the number, size and type of dishes left on the patron's table at the end. In modern yum cha restaurants, servers mark orders by stamping a card or marking a bill card on the table.  Servers in some restaurants use distinctive stamps to track sales statistics for each server.

Customs and etiquette

The customs associated with the tea served at yum cha include: 

 Selecting the type of tea to be served immediately after being seated by the server.
 Pouring tea for others before filling one's own tea cup, especially for the young ones serving tea to the elderly first, as a sign of politeness.
 Filling tea cups to about 80% because of the Cantonese proverb 「」, which is translated literally as "it is fraud for the guest if the tea cup is full, but it is a sign of respect when it is alcohol."
 Tapping the table with two (occasionally one) fingers of the same hand in a gesture known is as 'finger kowtow' that is a gesture of gratitude after receiving tea. This gesture can be traced to the Qianlong Emperor of the Qing dynasty, who used to travel incognito. While visiting the Jiangnan region, he once went into a teahouse with his companions. In order to maintain his anonymity, he took his turn at pouring tea. His companions wanted to bow to show their gratitude, but to do so would have revealed the identity of the emperor. Finally, one of them tapped three fingers on the table (one finger representing their bowed head and the other two representing their prostrate arms).
 Flipping open the lid (of hinged metal tea pots) or offset the tea pot cover (on ceramic tea pots) to signal an empty tea pot. Servers will then refill the pot.
 Following a traditional practice of washing the utensils with the first round of tea, tea is best served in hot cup to restore the temperature.  A basin is available for disposing of the rinse tea.  The taste of the first round of tea is considered not the finest yet, and will be richer afterwards.

For the diners, some typical customs include:

 Selecting the tables closest to the kitchen because the dim sum carts exit from there and the diners closest to the kitchen have first choice of the fresh dishes.
 Ordering dessert dishes on the dim sum carts at any time since there is not a set sequence for the meal.
 Feeling comfortable with declining dishes being offered by servers pushing the dim sum carts, regardless of the reasons (dietary, food preference, budgetary, or other reasons).

While eating, some of the manners include:

 Spinning the lazy susan such that the oldest person at the table has the opportunity to have the first serving when the meal starts or when an additional dish is served, to show respect.  The lazy susan should not be spun when someone is taking food from a dish.
 Refraining from standing chopsticks straight up vertically, such as in rice or buns, due to the resemblance of incense offerings for the deceased.
 Offering dining companions the final serving when there is one last piece or final serving remaining on a dish.
 Insisting on paying the bill as it is common to treat one another to meals.
In the case when there is no lazy Susan, only pick up the food which is in front of you.

Status and future 
Yum cha continues in both traditional and modern forms, including restaurants serving both traditional and modern fusion dim sum.  Modern dim sum can include dishes like abalone siu mai and barbecued wagyu beef bun.  Dim sum chefs for yum cha continue to be trained at leading culinary institutes.  One restaurant in Hong Kong creates social media-friendly dishes by preparing dumplings and buns shaped to resemble animals.  Whether traditional or modern-day, yum cha is to be shared with friends and loved ones.

See also
Dim sum
Table sharing
Lin Heung Tea House
Hong Kong cuisine
Tea (meal)

References

Further reading
Everything You Want to Know about Chinese Cooking by Pearl Kong Chen, Tien Chi Chen, and Rose Tseng. Woodbury, New York: Barron's, 1983.
How to Cook and Eat in Chinese by Buwei Yang Chao. New York: The John Day Company, 1945.
Dim Sum: The Delicious Secrets of Home-Cooked Chinese Tea Lunch by Rhoda Yee. San Francisco: Taylor & Ng, 1977.
Classic Deem Sum by Henry Chan, Yukiko, and Bob Haydock. New York: Holt, Rinehart, and Winston, 1985.
Chinese Dessert, Dim Sum and Snack Cookbook edited by Wonona Chong. New York: Sterling, 1986.
Tiny Delights: Companion to the TV series by Elizabeth Chong. Melbourne: Forte Communications, 2002.

External links

The Culinary Institute of America - Dim sum for Breakfast at Hong Kong's Lin Heung Restaurant
The Sydney Morning Herald - Guide to Yum Cha Dishes
The Gothamist - How to Dim Sum: A Beginner's Guide

Breakfast
Cantonese cuisine
Cantonese words and phrases
Chinese tea culture
Hong Kong cuisine